Brittany Louise Pettersen (born December 6, 1981) is an American politician serving as the U.S. representative from Colorado's 7th congressional district since 2023. She previously served as a member of the Colorado Senate from the 22nd district, and in the Colorado House of Representatives, representing the 28th district. She is a member of the Democratic Party.

Education 
Pettersen earned a Bachelor of Arts degree in political science from the Metropolitan State University of Denver.

Early political career
Before running for state representative, Pettersen worked for New Era Colorado, a nonprofit progressive political advocacy group that works to increase youth participation in politics and the government process.

2013 legislative session
In 2013, Pettersen opposed a repeal of the death penalty in Colorado.

2019 recall effort
In July 2019, the Colorado secretary of state approved the circulation of a recall petition against Pettersen. The recall's organizers had until September 16, 2019, to gather 18,376 signatures to put the recall on the ballot, but on September 10 they announced that they were abandoning the effort and not submitting signatures. The recall petition stated that Pettersen should be recalled because she supports taxpayer-funded heroin-injection sites, and because she supported SB 19-042 (the National Popular Vote bill), SB 19-181 (Comprehensive Oil and Gas Reform), HB 19-1032 (Comprehensive Human Sexuality Education), and HB 19-1177 (the Red Flag bill that allows a judge to prohibit an individual from possessing a firearm).

U.S. House of Representatives

Elections

2018 

On April 9, 2017, following Ed Perlmutter's announcement that he was running for governor of Colorado, Pettersen announced her candidacy for Colorado's 7th congressional district. After Perlmutter reentered the congressional race, she ended her campaign. In 2018, Pettersen ran for and won Colorado Senate District 22.

2022 

After Perlmutter announced that he would retire from the United States House of Representatives after the 2022 legislative session, Pettersen declared her candidacy for Colorado's 7th congressional district. She was elected in November with over 56% of the vote.

Caucus memberships 

 New Democrat Coalition

Committee assignments 

 House Committee on Financial Services

Personal life 
In 2017, Pettersen married Ian Silverii, the executive director of ProgressNow Colorado, at the Colorado Governor's Mansion. Pettersen and Silverii have one child.

References

External links
Brittany Pettersen for Congress campaign website 
Senator Brittany Pettersen official legislative website
 

|-

|-

|-

1981 births
21st-century American politicians
21st-century American women politicians
Democratic Party Colorado state senators
Democratic Party members of the Colorado House of Representatives
Democratic Party members of the United States House of Representatives from Colorado
Female members of the United States House of Representatives
Living people
Metropolitan State University of Denver alumni
People from Lakewood, Colorado
Women state legislators in Colorado